X30 may refer to:

Conquest X-30, Hasbro super-sonic jet toy
Dell Axim x30, Dell's Windows Mobile-powered Pocket PC Device
Fujifilm X30, advanced digital compact camera announced by Fujifilm in 2014
Rockwell X-30, advanced technology demonstrator project for the National Aero-Space Plane (NASP)
X30 (New York City bus)

fr:X-30